The Nigerian Army Officers’ Wives Association (NAOWA) is a non-profit, non-governmental organization with the objectives of assisting the poor and the needy and raising the standard of living in the barracks of the nation. Since its establishment over four decades ago, NAOWA has been in the vanguard of the provision of community health centres to complement the health care delivery services and carefully designed welfare programmes that are targeted at women, youths, children and the less privileged in Nigeria. The organisation has been described as "the most powerful women's organisation in the country".

History
NAOWA began in the 1950s as ‘Army Wives Association’ (AWA). The association ventured into charitable activities during the tenure of Welby Everald between 1962 and 1965. Members were encouraged to donate to orphanages, thus forming the basis for the modern aims and objectives of the association.

The name of the association was changed to Nigerian Army Officers’ Wives Association (NAOWA) on attainment of Nigeria’s Republican status in 1963.  Victoria Aguyi-Ironsi was the first indigenous president of the association.  Since then, NAOWA has had 23 distinguished successive national presidents with varying lengths of tenure. Since the association is non-governmental and non-profit making with no subvention from either federal or state government, most of its programmes are derived through the benevolence of individuals and corporate bodies.

Initiatives
The association has over the years established day-care centres, model nursery and primary schools, skill acquisition centres, shopping malls and children’s parks in many locations across the country. This move brought about the construction of a befitting modern vocational training centre in Abuja.  The rationale behind this initiative is to further complement the Nigerian Army and federal government welfare programmes to emancipate and broaden the knowledge of soldiers’ wives, youths, widows and the less privileged from ignorance, poverty and diseases in order to redress the prevalent imbalance in the area of education in their barracks and immediate environment. In addition to this, the aim is to contribute to nation building by producing self-employed people who can establish on their own and employ others, by contributing to the societal welfare through the training of the underprivileged and to assist military personnel in acquiring basic skills so that they can be efficient, self-sustaining and self-reliant on retirement. The centre will be moderated by the following bodies; Nigerian Army School of Finance and Administration (NASFA), Industrial Training Fund (ITF) in conformity with National Board for Technical Education (NBTE).  The following are the proposed diploma and certificate courses:

Secretarial Studies
Catering and hotel management
Fashion and textile designing
Computer studies
Cosmetology
Hairdressing and barbering
Extramural and adult education

NAOWA undertakes a number of social and philanthropic activities in order  to contribute to the well being of the barracks community and its surrounding environment particularly, widows, orphans, unemployed barracks youths and the less privileged. 

Statistics taken from all the divisions of Nigerian Army Barracks, showed that the number of female children enrolled in barrack schools dropped to 50% between primary and secondary school, with only a handful proceeding to any form of higher education. This problem transcends all segments of Nigerian society including the barracks community. It is in realization of this that the United Nations Children’s Funds (UNICEF), federal government and some state governments established respective programmes for female education. However, as broad and laudable as these programmes their impact is yet to reach girls in Nigerian Army Barracks. Based on this information, the association deemed it necessary to embark on the programme dedicated towards enhancing the education of girls and reverse these negative trends that inhibit equal opportunities and gender insensitive laws practiced among children. In line with this, NAOWA has already flagged off the Girl Child Education Programme (GCEP) campaign in many states of the federation.

In pursuit of its aim and objectives, NAOWA support governments and other agencies in the provision of self-help projects, vocational training centres,  periodic donation and contribution of  cash, drugs, treated mosquito nets and other relief materials to ‘Homes’ for the motherless, elderly and destitute. The activities of the association is not only limited to barracks alone, it is also extended to the surrounding communities.  Hence the need to embark on the construction of a modern maternity centre equipped with state-of-the-art facility in Kaduna (Northern Nigeria) for the provision of maternal and child health services. The centre, when established, will improve access to basic health care and medical services, especially focused on improving women's health and drastically reducing child and maternal mortality. NAOWA is also making effort to partner with local community leaders to extend quality health services beyond the formal healthcare system. The association is concerned with preventive rather than curative aspects of health within a larger population-level, rather than individual-level health issues.  The main focus of the association is intervention to prevent rather than treat a disease through surveillance of cases and the promotion of healthy behaviours.  In many cases treating a disease may be vital to preventing it in others, such as during an outbreak of an infectious disease.   In addition, NAOWA also carries out a periodic enlightenment campaign on hand washing, vaccination programme, and environmental sanitation to improve lives through the prevention and treatment of diseases.

Magazine
NAOWA publishes a magazine as the mouthpiece of the association, showcasing its activities and write-up on topical issues, opinion and comments, socio-cultural, entertainment and political events across the globe.  The magazine is published annually and it enjoys a wide readership and circulation to all military formations across the country.  The maiden and second edition of the magazine were published in 2007 and 2008 respectively.

References

Military of Nigeria
Military-related organizations